Andrew Balkwill (born 24 March 1972) is a former Australian rules footballer who played for the Carlton Football Club in the Australian Football League (AFL). Originally with Central District, he and Ben Nelson were traded to Carlton for Brent Heaver at the end of the 1996 season.

Balkwill played his sole game for Carlton in Round 3, 1997 – the game best remembered for Carlton wearing sky blue guernseys as part of a cross-promotion for the new blue-coloured M&M's. Balkwill never played a senior game in the club's traditional navy blue – which was a unique distinction until the club later introduced clash guernseys.

He was formerly the Principal of Thomas More College Salisbury, but is now the Principal of Mercedes College Adelaide beginning in 2020.

Notes

External links

Andrew Balkwill's profile at Blueseum

1972 births
Carlton Football Club players
Central District Football Club players
Australian rules footballers from South Australia
Living people